Chenraj Roychand (born 7 July 1961) is the founder of the Jain Group and Chancellor - Jain University since 1990.

Jain (Deemed-to-be University) 

Roychand started The Sri Bhagawan Mahaveer Jain College in Bangalore in the year 1990 at VV Puram which to date remains as the well-known colleges in the city. He went on to establish schools and colleges across the country in a matter of two decades Jain (Deemed-to-be University) was declared Deemed University under the UGC Act, 1956.

Chenraj Roychand Center for Entrepreneurship 

Chenraj who aspired to actively empower rural and urban populace established Chenraj Roychand Center for Entrepreneurship which continues to be one of his notable achievements . The center aims to create an ecosystem to produce successful social entrepreneurs. He who became an entrepreneur at a very young age has his experience behind him to recognize the real creative minds who can work with passion and yield turbulent growth. His benevolent attitude towards his underlings encourages many to follow their passion. The centre has so far incubated 50 companies where the companies are trained to identify an idea, understand hi-tech markets and emerging technologies. Chenraj Roychand has plans of creating 500 entrepreneurs in the next five years.

T.V. Mohandas Pai, Chairman of Manipal Global Education said about Chenraj Roychand, "He is the Indian version of an angel investor with a lot of mentoring and support, where you treat it as a family business and the entrepreneur becomes part of the family. It is not like the Western model of high growth and high return. Here, the person who is mentoring is more important than the investment."

References

1961 births
Living people
Businesspeople from Bangalore